Korte Dorbor Bazzie (born November 29, 1989), known professionally as Kobazzie, is a Liberian singer and songwriter. Born in Voinjama, Lofa County, Kobazzie was inspired to pursue a career in music after hearing Quincy B's collaborative single with Tan Tan B, titled "State of Emergency". He is the recipient of several accolades, including New Artist of the Year at the 2016 Liberia Music Awards and Afropop Artist of the Year at the 2019 Tunes Liberia Music Awards.

Early life and career 
Korte Dorbor Bazzie was born on November 29, 1989, in Voinjama, Lofa County. He relocated to Monrovia to further his education and graduated from St. Michael Catholic School. He studied accounting and business management at Cuttington University and graduated in 2017. Prior to pursuing a career in music, he worked as an accountant. Kobazzie met singer and record producer Quincy B while in school and was inspired to sing after hearing the singer's collaborative single with Tan Tan B, titled "State of Emergency".

In 2017, he released the Quincy B-produced track "Sleep for What". Kobazzie said he received the song's instrumental from the producer and freestyled the lyrics. "Sleep for What" appeared on Press Play, a 2017 compilation album released by Bilikon Entertainment. Kobazzie told FrontPage Africa that Liberian women inspires him to make music. He was one of the performing acts at the 2017 Nigeria Entertainment Awards, and appeared in an episode of BBC African Voices and VOA African Beat series that same year. Kobazzie left Bilikon Entertainment, a record label owned by Lyee Bility. He told the Daily Observer newspaper that his record deal with the label wasn't profitable. A week after leaving the label, Kobazzie released the single "Shout Out". He recorded the song prior to exiting the label and debunked rumours about the song being a diss track.

In 2018, Kobazzie told FrontPage Africa he was working on his 6-track debut extended play, and confirmed that the previously released singles "Check Mike" and "Abelaibah" would appear on the project. On August 3, 2018, Koabazzie released the single "Bounce". It won Song of the Year at the 2019 Liberian Entertainment Awards, and was nominated for the same award at both the 2018 Liberia Music Awards and 2019 Tunes Liberia Music Awards. The remix of "Bounce", which features guest vocals by Nigerian singer Davido, was released on March 3, 2019. The song was jointly produced by Kizzy W, Benny Sound, and DrumPhase. Its accompanying music video was directed by Simplicity Visuals Studios. The remix of "Bounce" was nominated for Afropop Song of the Year and Collaboration of the Year at the 2019 Liberia Music Awards. Moreover, the song's music video was nominated for Best Music Video at the 2020 Liberian Entertainment Awards and for Best Video of the Year at the 2020 Tunes Liberia Music Awards.

On September 24, 2021, Kobazzie released the Stonebwoy-assisted single "Everyday". He chose to collaborate with Stonebwoy because he wanted to blend afrobeats with dancehall, and believes the singer has a "different vibe of music". After winning an award at the Liberia People's Choice Awards in 2019, he was told he could collaborate with any African artist and video producer of his choice. "Everyday" was initially scheduled for release in the last week of August 2021, along with its music video.

In May 2022, Kobazzie performed at four musical concerts held across Nimba, Margibi, Grand Bassa, and Montserrado counties. The concerts commemorated the fifth anniversary of Orange S.A.'s arrival in Liberia, and featured additional performances from MC Caro, Stunna, and Kpanto, among others.

Humanatarian works and criticism of a charity foundation
Kobazzie spoke out against rape and gender-based violence issues, and was among a panel of speakers advocating for youth empowerment at the United Nations Symposium in New York. He released the anti-rape song "Say No to Rape", and worked with Stunna and Cralorboi CIC to release the politically inspired track "Say No to Election Violence". Kobazzie urged the Liberian government to prosecute Katie Meyler, the founder of the More Than Me charity organization. He accused her of covering up the sexual abuse scandal at the organization and said her actions were "inhumane and neglectful".

Personal life
Kobazzie has a girl child.

Awards and nominations

See also
List of Liberian musicians

References

1989 births
Living people
Liberian male musicians
People from Lofa County
Liberian singers
Liberian songwriters